Ladies' Gaelic football is a women's team sport. It is the women's equivalent of Gaelic football. Ladies' football is organised by the Ladies' Gaelic Football Association. Two teams of 15 players kick or hand-pass a round ball towards goals at each end of a grass pitch, since May 2022 women Gaelic footballers have to wear shin pads. The sport is mainly played in the Republic of Ireland and Northern Ireland, where the two main competitions are the All-Ireland Senior Ladies' Football Championship and the Ladies' National Football League. Both competitions feature teams representing the traditional Gaelic games counties. The 2017 All-Ireland Senior Ladies' Football Championship Final was the best attended women's sports final of 2017. The 2019 final, after the 2019 FIFA Women's World Cup Final, was the second largest attendance at any women's sporting final during 2019. Historically Cork and Kerry have been the sport's most successful counties. Waterford, Monaghan and Mayo have also experienced spells of success. In more recent years, 2017 to 2020, Dublin have been the dominant team.

Ladies' Gaelic football is also played in Africa, Asia, Great Britain, Canada, Europe, South America, the United States, New Zealand and Australia. Outside of Ireland it is mainly, although not exclusively, played by members of the Irish diaspora. There is also a seven-a-side version of the sport.

Timeline

Most successful counties

Differences from men's football

Most of the rules of ladies' Gaelic football are the same as those for the men's game. The main differences are:
 A player may pick the ball up directly from the ground, so long as she is standing.
 Most matches last 60 minutes; in men's senior inter-county football, games last 70 minutes.
 Kickouts may be taken from the hand.
 Changing hands: throwing the ball from your right hand to left or vice versa.
 A countdown clock with siren is used if available; in the men's game, the referee decides the end of the game.
 All deliberate bodily contact is forbidden except when "shadowing" an opponent, competing to catch the ball, or blocking the delivery of the ball.
 A smaller size 4 Gaelic ball is used compared to the size 5 ball used in the men's game.
 Since 2020 a '45 has been worth 2 points if it goes straight over without a deflection, otherwise it is worth 1 point.

References

 
Gaelic games
Women's sports
Women's team sports
Sports originating in Ireland